Percival Andree Pickering (8 February 1810 – 7 August 1876) was an English first-class cricketer and lawyer.

Pickering was born at London in February 1810. He made a single appearance in first-class cricket in 1846 for the Surrey Club against the Marylebone Cricket Club at Lord's. He batted in both Surrey Club innings', being dismissed without scoring by William Hillyer in their first-innings, while in their second-innings he was dismissed by Jemmy Dean for 3 runs.

Pickering married Anne Maria Spencer-Stanhope, the daughter of John Spencer Stanhope, in 1853. He was appointed as a Queen's Counsel. The couple had three children: the author Anna Pickering; the chemist and horticulturist Percival Spencer Umfreville Pickering; and the painter Evelyn De Morgan. He died at Dover in August 1876. His brother, William, was fundamental in the formation of Surrey County Cricket Club.

References

External links

1810 births
1876 deaths
Cricketers from Greater London
English cricketers
Surrey Club cricketers
English barristers
English King's Counsel
19th-century King's Counsel
19th-century English lawyers